Miyashiro (written: 都城, 宮代, 宮城) is a Japanese surname. 宮代 also be pronounced Miyadai. 宮城 also be pronounced Miyagi. In Okinawan language, 宮城 may be pronounced Naagusuku or Naagushiku. Notable people with the surname include:

, Japanese geologist
Aldo Miyashiro (born 1976), Peruvian playwright, screenwriter and actor
Augusto Miyashiro (born 1949), Peruvian engineer and politician
Daisuke Miyashiro (born 1991), Japanese footballer
Paulo Miyashiro, Brazilian triathlete
Ron Miyashiro, American artist
Tamari Miyashiro (born 1987), American volleyball player

Japanese-language surnames
Okinawan surnames